Brigitte Sy (born 26 January 1956) is a French actress and filmmaker. Her directorial film debut, Les Mains libres, was released in 2010 to critical acclaim in France.

Life and career
She is the mother of the actors Louis Garrel and Esther Garrel whom she had with the director Philippe Garrel. In an Arte short film collection about AIDS awareness, she revealed that she has been HIV-positive since 1990, contracted from a partner who previously had a drug addiction. She also addresses the issue in Les mains libres and L'endroit idéal where the protagonist, Barbara (played by Ronit Elkabetz), is HIV-positive. She opposes the feminist #MeToo movement (#BalanceTonPorc in France) and signed an anti-metoo letter in Le Monde, on 9 January 2018, arguing that men have the freedom to harass (importuner) women.

She is of Sephardic Jewish descent.

Filmography

As actress

As filmmaker

Awards and nominations

References

External links

Fruits de mer

1956 births
Living people
French film actresses
French film directors
French screenwriters
20th-century French Sephardi Jews
French television actresses
French women film directors
French women screenwriters
HIV/AIDS activists
Female critics of feminism
Jewish French actresses
People with HIV/AIDS
20th-century French actresses
21st-century French actresses